Brañuelas is a locality and minor local entity located in the municipality of Villagatón, in León province, Castile and León, Spain As of 2020, it has a population of 225.

Geography 
Brañuelas is located 81km west of León, Spain.

References

Populated places in the Province of León